The Naval Crown was a gold crown surmounted with small replicas of the prows of ships.  It was a Roman military award, given to the first man who boarded an enemy ship during a naval engagement.

In heraldry a naval crown is mounted atop the shields of coats of arms of the naval vessels and other units belonging to some navies. It is made up of a circlet with the sails and sterns of ships alternating on top.

Gallery

See also

Astral crown
Camp crown
Celestial crown
Civic crown
Grass crown
Mural crown
Naval heraldry
Laurel wreath

References
Naval Crown definition. Libro de Armoría. 
Heraldic crowns, www.scottish-wedding-dreams.com
Fox-Davies, Arthur Charles (1909) A Complete Guide to Heraldry, Chapter XXIII: Crest, Coronets and Chapeaux.

Military awards and decorations of ancient Rome
Crowns in heraldry
Military heraldry